Lee Sang-hup (born 3 August 1986 in Yongin, Gyeonggi) is a retired South Korean footballer who played as winger. Both accuracy and strength that perfect left-foot are once evaluated as best in South Korea. His nickname is 'crazy left-foot'.

Club career 
In 2005, he debuted in K League for FC Seoul, and made 2 appearances in 2 years, inclusive of the K-League Cup, but began to increase the number of appearances by starter player from Şenol Güneş became the new manager. He has contributed to the runner-up for 2008 K-League.

He moved to Jeju United in 2010. In all competitions Lee scored 6 goals in 18 appearances for Jeju United.

On 29 July 2011, Lee joined Daejeon Citizen on loan from Jeju United.

Club career statistics

Honours

Club 
FC Seoul
League Cup (1): 2006
Jeju United
K League Runners Up: 2010

External links
 
 

1986 births
Living people
Association football forwards
South Korean footballers
FC Seoul players
Jeju United FC players
Daejeon Hana Citizen FC players
Gimcheon Sangmu FC players
Jeonbuk Hyundai Motors players
Seongnam FC players
Gyeongnam FC players
K League 2 players
K League 1 players
People from Yongin
Sportspeople from Gyeonggi Province